Christian Elliss (born January 2, 1999) is an American football linebacker for the Philadelphia Eagles of the National Football League (NFL). He played college football at Idaho and was originally signed as an undrafted free agent by the Minnesota Vikings.

Early life and education
Elliss was born on January 2, 1999, in Highlands Ranch, Colorado, to Luther and Rebecca Elliss. He was the third-oldest of 12 children. His older brother Kaden plays for the Atlanta Falcons in the National Football League (NFL). He attended high school at Valor Christian, leading his team to the state final as a senior, and earning the South Metro co-Defensive Player of the Year award. Following high school, Elliss accepted a scholarship offer from University of Idaho.

As a true freshman in 2017, playing for their Idaho Vandals football team, Elliss played in eleven games, recording 30 tackles and one interception. He gained a starting position as a sophomore, playing in all eleven games as a starter at the middle linebacker position. He led the team with 81 tackles and was named All-Big Sky. He changed to outside linebacker as a junior, starting all eleven games and earning first-team All-Big Sky honors. He led the team with 4.5 sacks and placed second with 104 tackles. The 2020 season was canceled, but later a spring 2021 schedule was announced. In a shortened 2021 season with five games, Elliss made 50 tackles and was selected to first-team All-Big Sky for the second consecutive season.

Professional career

Minnesota Vikings
Following the 2021 NFL Draft, where Elliss went unselected, he was signed as an undrafted free agent by the Minnesota Vikings. Following a preseason game, he was fined $3,731 for an unnecessary roughness penalty. He was released two days later on August 23.

Philadelphia Eagles
Elliss was signed to the practice squad of the Philadelphia Eagles on September 9. He was released on October 6, but re-signed with the practice squad five days later. He was released on October 18.

San Francisco 49ers
On November 3, 2021, Elliss was signed to the San Francisco 49ers practice squad, but was released a week later.

Philadelphia Eagles (second stint)
Elliss was re-signed to the practice squad of the Philadelphia Eagles on November 24. Elliss made his NFL debut on January 8, 2022, in the Eagles' week 18 game against the Dallas Cowboys, collecting 3 combined tackles in the 51-26 loss. He signed a reserve/future contract with the Eagles on January 18, 2022.

On August 30, 2022, Elliss was waived by the Eagles and signed to the practice squad the next day. He was elevated to the active roster for their week thirteen game against the Tennessee Titans, and was a key player on special teams, making five total tackles and helping block for punt returner Britain Covey as he had the second-best single-game return average on the season. He was signed to the active roster on December 23. Elliss finished the 2022 regular season with six games played and 11 total tackles.

References

External links
Philadelphia Eagles bio

1999 births
Living people
Players of American football from Colorado
American football linebackers
Idaho Vandals football players
Minnesota Vikings players
People from Highlands Ranch, Colorado
Philadelphia Eagles players
San Francisco 49ers players